El Capitan ("the Captain" or "the Chief") is a vertical rock formation in Yosemite National Park, on the north side of Yosemite Valley, near its western end.

Naming

The formation was named "El Capitan" by the Mariposa Battalion when they explored the valley in 1851. El Capitán ("the captain", "the chief") was taken to be a loose Spanish translation of the local Native American name for the cliff, “Tutokanula” or "Rock Chief" (the exact spelling of Tutokanula varies in different accounts as it is a phonetic transcription of the Miwok language).

The "Rock Chief" etymology is based on the written account of Mariposa Battalion doctor Lafayette Bunnell in his 1892 book. Bunnell reports that Ahwahneechee Chief Tenaya explained to him, forty-one years earlier, in 1851, that the massive formation, called Tutokanula, could be translated as "Rock Chief" because the face of the cliff looks like a giant rock Chief. In Bunnell's account, however, he notes that this translation may be wrong, stating: “I am not etymologist enough to understand just how the word has been constructed… [If] I am found in error, I shall be most willing to acknowledge it, for few things appear more uncertain, or more difficult to obtain, than a complete understanding of the soul of an Indian language.” 

An alternative etymology is that "Tutokanula" is Miwok for “Inchworm Rock”. Julia F. Parker, the preeminent Coast Miwok-Kashaya Pomo basket-weaver and Yosemite Museum cultural ambassador since 1960, explains that the name Tutokanula, or “Inchworm Rock”, originates in the Miwok creation story for the giant rock, a legend in which two bear cubs are improbably rescued by a humble inchworm. In the story, a mother bear and her two cubs are walking along the river. The mother forages for seeds and berries while the two cubs nap in the sun on a flat rock. While the cubs sleep, the rock grows and grows, above the trees and into the sky. The mother bear is unable to climb the rock to get to her cubs and she becomes afraid and asks for help. The fox, the mouse, the mountain lion, and every other animal tries to climb to the top of the giant rock but they each fail. Finally, the lowly little inchworm tries the climb and successfully makes it all the way to the top and rescues the cubs. All the animals are happy to see that the little inchworm has saved the two bear cubs and the rock is named in the inchworm’s honor.

The “Inchworm Rock” version of the meaning of Tutokanula is also described in the story "Two Bear Cubs: A Miwok Legend from California's Yosemite Valley" by Robert D. San Souci and in the First People Miwok recounting of the El Cap legend. 

The top of El Capitan can be reached by hiking out of Yosemite Valley on the trail next to Yosemite Falls, then proceeding west. For climbers, the challenge is to climb up the sheer granite face. There are many named climbing routes, all of them arduous, including Iron Hawk and Sea of Dreams.

Geology

El Capitan is composed almost entirely of a pale, coarse-grained granite approximately 100 MYA (million years old). In addition to El Capitan, this granite forms most of the rock features of the western portions of Yosemite Valley. A separate intrusion of igneous rock, the Taft Granite, forms the uppermost portions of the cliff face.

A third igneous rock, diorite, is present as dark-veined intrusions through both kinds of granite, especially prominent in the area known as the North America Wall.

Along with most of the other rock formations of Yosemite Valley, El Capitan was carved by glacial action. Several periods of glaciation have occurred in the Sierra Nevada, but the Sherwin Glaciation, which lasted from approximately 1.3 MYA to 1 MYA, is considered to be responsible for the majority of the sculpting. The El Capitan Granite is relatively free of joints, and as a result the glacial ice did not erode the rock face as much as other, more jointed, rocks nearby. Nonetheless, as with most of the rock forming Yosemite's features, El Capitan's granite is under enormous internal tension brought on by the compression experienced prior to the erosion that brought it to the surface. These forces contribute to the creation of features such as the Texas Flake, a large block of granite slowly detaching from the main rock face about halfway up the side of the cliff.

Climbing history

Between the two main faces, the Southwest (on the left when looking directly at the wall) and the Southeast, is a prow. While today there are numerous established routes on both faces, the most popular and most historically famous route is The Nose, which follows this prow.

Pioneering The Nose

The Nose was climbed in 1958 by Warren Harding, Wayne Merry and George Whitmore in 47 days using "siege" tactics: climbing in an expedition style using fixed ropes along the length of the route, linking established camps along the way. The fixed manila ropes allowed the climbers to ascend and descend from the ground throughout the 18-month project, although they presented unique levels of danger as well, sometimes breaking due to the long exposure to cold temperatures. The climbing team relied heavily on aid climbing, using rope, pitons and expansion bolts to make it to the summit. The second ascent of The Nose was in 1960 by Royal Robbins, Joe Fitschen, Chuck Pratt and Tom Frost, who took seven days in the first continuous climb of the route without siege tactics. The first solo climb of The Nose was done by Tom Bauman in 1969. The first ascent of The Nose in one day was accomplished in 1975 by John Long, Jim Bridwell and Billy Westbay.

Expansion of routes
Efforts during the 1960s and 1970s explored the other faces of El Capitan, and many of the early routes are still popular today. Among the early classics are the Salathé Wall (1961, Royal Robbins, Chuck Pratt and Tom Frost) on the southwest face, and the North America Wall (1964, Royal Robbins, Yvon Chouinard, Chuck Pratt and Tom Frost) on the southeast face. Also climbed in the 1960s are routes such as: Dihedral Wall (1962, Ed Cooper, Jim Baldwin and Glen Denny); West Buttress (1963, Layton Kor and Steve Roper); and Muir Wall (1965, Yvon Chouinard and TM Herbert).
 Later ascents include: Wall of the Early Morning Light, now known as Dawn Wall, on the Southeast face, adjacent to the prow (1970, Warren Harding and Dean Caldwell); Zodiac (1972, Charlie Porter (solo)); The Shield (1972, Porter and Gary Bocarde); Mescalito (1973, Porter, Steve Sutton, Hugh Burton and C. Nelson); Pacific Ocean Wall (1975, Jim Bridwell, Billy Westbay, Jay Fiske and Fred East); Sea of Dreams (1978, Bridwell, Dale Bard and Dave Diegelman); Jolly Roger (1979, Charles Cole and Steve Grossman); and Wings of Steel (1982, Richard Jensen and Mark Smith). Today there are over 70 routes on El Capitan of various difficulties and danger levels. New routes continue to be established, usually consisting of additions to, or links between, existing routes.

Solo climbing
After his successful solo ascent of the Leaning Tower, Royal Robbins turned his attention to the Yvon Chouinard-T.M. Herbert Muir Wall route, completing the first solo ascent of El Capitan in 10 days in 1968. The first solo ascents of El Capitan's four classic "siege" routes were accomplished by Thomas Bauman on The Nose in 1969; Peter Hann on the Salathé Wall in 1972; Robert Kayen on the Layton Kor-Steve Roper West Buttress route in 1982; and Beverly Johnson on the Cooper-Baldwin-Denny Dihedral Wall route in 1978. Other noteworthy early solo ascents were the solo first ascent of Cosmos by Jim Dunn in 1972, Zodiac by Charlie Porter in 1972; Tangerine Trip by David Mittel in 1985; and The Pacific Ocean Wall by Robert Slater in 1982. These ascents took 7 to 14 days that required the solo climber lead each pitch, and then rappel, clean the climbing gear, reascend the lead rope, and haul equipment, food and water using a second haul rope.

Ascents by women

Beverly Johnson successfully ascended El Capitan, via the Nose route, with Dan Asay in June 1973. In September 1973, Beverly Johnson and Sibylle Hechtel were the first team of women to ascend El Capitan via the Triple Direct route, which takes the first ten pitches of the Salathe Wall, then continues up the middle portion of El Capitan via the Muir Wall, and finishes on the upper pitches of the Nose route. In 1977, Molly Higgins and Barb Eastman climbed the Nose, to become the second party of women to climb El Capitan and the first to climb it via the Nose. In 1978, Bev Johnson was the first woman to solo El Capitan by climbing the Dihedral Wall. In 1993, Lynn Hill established the first free Ascent of The Nose (IV 5.14a/b). Hazel Findlay has made three free ascents of El Capitan, including the first female ascent of Golden Gate in 2011, the first female ascent of Pre-Muir Wall in 2012, and a three-day ascent of Freerider in 2013 and 'Salathe' in 2017. The oldest woman to climb El Capitan is Dierdre Wolownick, mother to Alex Honnold, who was 66 at the time when she first became the oldest woman to climb El Capitan in 2017, and later broke her own record and again became the oldest woman to climb El Capitan in 2021 on her 70th birthday. On June 12, 2019, 10-year-old Selah Schneiter became the then-youngest person to scale El Capitan, via The Nose route. On November 4, 2020, American Emily Harrington became the fourth woman to free climb El Capitan in a single day and the fourth person (and first woman) to have done so via the route Golden Gate.

Free climbing

As it became clear that any non-crumbling face could be conquered with sufficient perseverance and bolt-hole drilling, some climbers began searching for El Capitan routes that could be climbed either free or with minimal aid. The West Face route was free climbed in 1979 by Ray Jardine and Bill Price; but despite numerous efforts by Jardine and others, The Nose resisted free attempts for another fourteen  years. The first free ascent of a main El Cap route, though, was not The Nose, but Salathé Wall. Todd Skinner and Paul Piana made the first free ascent over 9 days in 1988, after 30 days of working the route (graded 5.13b on the Yosemite Decimal System).  The Nose was the second major route to be freeclimbed. Two pitches on The Nose blocked efforts to free the route: the "Great Roof" graded 5.13c and "Changing Corners" graded 5.14a/b. In 1993, Lynn Hill came close to freeing The Nose, making it past the Great Roof and up to Camp VI without falling, stopped only on Changing Corners by a piton jammed in a critical finger hold. After removing the piton she re-climbed the route from the ground. After four days of climbing, Hill reached the summit, making her the first person to free climb The Nose. A year later, Hill returned to free climb The Nose in a day, this time reaching the summit in just 23 hours and setting a new standard for free climbing on El Capitan. 

The Nose saw a second free ascent in 1998, when Scott Burke summitted after 261 days of effort. On October 14, 2005, Tommy Caldwell and Beth Rodden, then husband and wife, became the third and fourth people (and the first couple) to free climb The Nose. They took four days on the ascent, swapping leads with each climber free climbing each pitch, either leading or following. Two days later, Caldwell returned to free climb The Nose in less than 12 hours.  Caldwell returned two weeks later to free climb El Capitan twice in a day, completing The Nose with Rodden, then descending and leading Freerider in a combined time of 23 hours 23 minutes.

On January 14, 2015, Tommy Caldwell and Kevin Jorgeson completed the first free climb of the Dawn Wall after 19 days, one of the hardest climbs in the world. In November 2016, Czech climber Adam Ondra free climbed the Dawn Wall in 8 days.

In 2016, Pete Whittaker became the first person to make an all-free rope solo ascent–which means on every pitch one free climbs to an anchor, abseils to retrieve gear, and then jumars up again to the high point–of El Capitan's Freerider in one day. He left the ground at 3:02 pm on November 11 and finished at 11:08 am on November 12; a total of 20 hours and 6 minutes.

Free solo 
Free solo climbing is a form of rock climbing where the climbers do not use any ropes, harnesses, or other protective equipment. This forces the climbers to only rely on their own individual preparation, strength, and skill.

On June 3, 2017, Alex Honnold completed the first free solo climb of El Capitan. He ascended the Freerider line in 3 hours and 56 minutes, beginning at 5:32 am and reaching the peak at 9:28 am. The climb was filmed for the 2018 documentary Free Solo.

Speed climbing

The speed climbing record for the Nose has changed hands several times in the past few years. The current sub-two-hour record of 1:58:07 was set on June 6, 2018, by Alex Honnold and Tommy Caldwell after two other record-breaking climbs in the days before.

Mayan Smith-Gobat and Libby Sauter broke the speed record for an all-women team with a time of 4:43 on October 23, 2014.

Climb photography
Climbers Tommy Caldwell, Lynn Hill, and Alex Honnold photographed their El Capitan climbs using 360 degree spherical VR photography. The photographs were taken by them or by other photographers during the climbs.

In January 2015, climbers Kevin Jorgeson and Tommy Caldwell photographed their free climb of the Dawn Wall.

Climb fatalities
Over thirty fatalities have been recorded between 1905 and 2018 while climbing El Capitan, including seasoned climbers. Critics blame a recent increase of fatalities (five deaths from 2013 to 2018) in part on increased competition around timed ascents, social media fame, and "competing for deals with equipment manufacturers or advertisers".

BASE jumping
El Capitan has a controversial history regarding BASE jumping, and the National Park Service has enacted criminal regulations which prohibit the practice. Michael Pelkey and Brian Schubert made the first BASE jump from El Capitan on July 24, 1966. Both men sustained broken bones from the jump. During the 1970s, with better equipment and training, many BASE jumpers made successful jumps from El Capitan. In 1980 the National Park Service experimented with issuing BASE-jumping permits. The first permitted BASE jump was performed on August 4, 1980, by Dean Westgaard of Laguna Beach. These legal jumps resulted in no major injuries or fatalities. After a trial lasting only ten weeks, the National Park Service ceased issuing permits and effectively shut down all BASE jumping on El Capitan. On October 22, 1999, BASE jumper and stuntwoman Jan Davis died in a jump conducted as part of a protest event involving five jumpers. The event was intended to protest the death of Frank Gambalie, who had landed safely but drowned while fleeing park rangers, and to demonstrate the assertion that BASE jumping could be performed safely.

Popular culture

In currency 
El Capitan is featured on a United States quarter dollar coin minted in 2010 as part of the America the Beautiful Quarters series.

In film 
In the opening title sequence of Star Trek V: The Final Frontier, James T. Kirk, portrayed by William Shatner, attempts a free solo climb of El Capitan.

In technology 
Apple named its 12th major release of macOS after El Capitan.

In music 
"El Capitan" is a song by Scottish rock band Idlewild from their fourth studio album, Warnings/Promises (2005). It was released as the third single from the album on 11 July 2005 and charted at No. 39 in the UK Singles Chart.[2]

See also
Horsetail Fall (Yosemite)
Sentinel Dome
Stawamus Chief
Half Dome

Notes

References

External links

  A list of long free climbs in Yosemite, including on El Capitan.

Articles containing video clips
Cliffs of the United States
Climbing areas of California
Igneous intrusions
Mountains of Mariposa County, California
Monoliths of the United States
Rock formations of Yosemite National Park
Tourist attractions in Mariposa County, California
Cretaceous magmatism
Igneous petrology of California
Felsic intrusions